Rhampholeon nchisiensis, the South African stumptail chameleon or Nchisi pygmy chameleon, is a species of chameleon found in Malawi and Tanzania.

References

Rhampholeon
Reptiles described in 1953
Taxa named by Arthur Loveridge
Reptiles of Malawi
Reptiles of Tanzania